Craig Lamar Traylor (born March 19, 1989) is an American actor and artist. He made his acting debut in an episode of ER in 1996 and portrayed Stevie Kenarban, the asthmatic, one-lunged boy in a wheelchair and the title character's best friend, in the Fox sitcom Malcolm in the Middle from the show's start in January 2000 to its conclusion in May 2006. He has also had small roles in the films Matilda and Get a Clue.

Personal life
In 2007, he graduated from Rancho Cucamonga High School in Rancho Cucamonga, California.

As of 2019, Traylor is a wire artist and designs wearable art.

Filmography

Film

Television

References

External links

1989 births
African-American male actors
American male child actors
American male television actors
Living people
People from San Bernardino County, California
21st-century African-American people
20th-century African-American people